Pachymenes is a small but widely distributed Neotropical genus of potter wasps, it has been proposed that another Neotropical genus, Santamenes, be merged into Pachymenes.

References

 Giordani Soika, A. 1990. Revisione degli Eumenidi neotropicali appartenenti ai generi Pachymenes Sauss., Santamenes n. gen., Brachymenes G. S., Pseudacaromenes G. S., Stenosigma G. S. e Gamma Zav. (Hymenoptera). Boll. Mus. Civ. Stor. Nat. Venezia 39: 71–172.

Potter wasps
Hymenoptera genera